Sir Halford John Mackinder (15 February 1861 – 6 March 1947) was an English geographer, academic and politician, who is regarded as one of the founding fathers of both geopolitics and geostrategy. He was the first Principal of University Extension College, Reading (which became the University of Reading) from 1892 to 1903, and Director of the London School of Economics from 1903 to 1908. While continuing his academic career part-time, he was also the Member of Parliament for Glasgow Camlachie from 1910 to 1922. From 1923, he was Professor of Geography at the London School of Economics.

Early life and education

Mackinder was born in Gainsborough, Lincolnshire, England, the son of a doctor, and educated at Queen Elizabeth's Grammar School in Gainsborough, Epsom College and Christ Church, Oxford. At Oxford he started studying natural sciences, specialising in zoology under Henry Nottidge Moseley, who had been the naturalist on the Challenger expedition. When he turned to the study of history, he remarked that he was returning "to an old interest and took up modern history with the idea of seeing how the theory of evolution would appear in human development". He was a strong proponent of treating both physical geography and human geography as a single discipline. Mackinder served as President of the Oxford Union in 1883.

He received a degree in biology in 1883 and one in modern history the next year.

Career
In 1887, he published "On the Scope and Methods of Geography", a manifesto for the New Geography. A few months later, he was appointed reader in geography at the University of Oxford, where he introduced the teaching of the subject. As Mackinder himself put it, "a platform has been given to a geographer". This was arguably at the time the most prestigious academic position for a British geographer. In 1892, he was the first principal of University Extension College, Reading, a role he retained until he was succeeded, in 1903, by William Macbride Childs. The college became the University of Reading in 1926, a progression that owed no small debt to his early stewardship of the institution. In 1893, he was one of the founders of the Geographical Association, which promotes the teaching of geography in schools. He later became chairman of the GA from 1913 to 1946 and served as its President from 1916–17.

In 1895, he was one of the founders of the London School of Economics. At Oxford, Mackinder was the driving force behind the creation of a School of Geography in 1899. In the same year, he led an expedition of the first Europeans to climb Mount Kenya. It was during this expedition that eight of his African porters were killed; it is disputed as to who killed them, as both Mackinder and another man, Edward Saunders were recorded issuing death threats. In 1902, he published Britain and the British Seas, which included the first comprehensive geomorphology of the British Isles and which became a classic in regional geography. He was a member of the Coefficients dining club, set up in 1902 by the Fabian campaigners Sidney and Beatrice Webb, which brought together social reformers and advocates of national efficiency.

In 1904, Mackinder gave a paper on "The Geographical Pivot of History" at the Royal Geographical Society, in which he formulated the Heartland Theory. This is often considered as a, if not the, founding moment of geopolitics as a field of study, although Mackinder did not use the term. Whilst the Heartland Theory initially received little attention outside geography, this theory would later exercise some influence on the foreign policies of world powers. Possibly disappointed at not getting a full chair, Mackinder left Oxford and became director of the London School of Economics in the same year. After 1908, he concentrated on advocating the cause of imperial unity and lectured only part-time. He stood unsuccessfully as a Liberal Unionist in a by-election for Hawick Burghs in 1909. He was elected to Parliament in January 1910 as Liberal Unionist member for the Glasgow Camlachie constituency and was defeated in 1922 as a Unionist. He was knighted in the 1920 New Year Honours for his services as an MP.

His next major work, Democratic Ideals and Reality: A Study in the Politics of Reconstruction, appeared in 1919. It followed the 1904 book  titled The Geographic Pivot of the History, and presented his theory of the Heartland and made a case for fully taking into account geopolitical factors at the Paris Peace conference and contrasted (geographical) reality with Woodrow Wilson's idealism. The book's most famous quote was: "Who rules East Europe commands the Heartland; Who rules the Heartland commands the World Island; Who rules the World Island commands the World." This message was composed to convince the world statesmen at the Paris Peace conference of the crucial importance of Eastern Europe as the strategic route to the Heartland was interpreted as requiring a strip of buffer states to separate Germany and Russia. These were created by the peace negotiators but proved to be ineffective bulwarks in 1939 (although this may be seen as a failure of other, later statesmen during the interbellum). The principal concern of his work was to warn of the possibility of another major war (a warning also given by economist John Maynard Keynes).

Mackinder was anti-Bolshevik, and as British High Commissioner in Southern Russia in late 1919 and early 1920, during the Russian Civil War, he stressed the need for Britain to continue her support to the White Russian forces, which he attempted to unite. Mackinder's last major work was the 1943 article, “The Round World and the Winning of the Peace,” in which he envisioned a post-war world. He reiterated and expanded his Heartland view of the world, suggesting that the Atlantic Ocean would be jumped, with North America's influence pulled into the region by its use of Britain as an "moated aerodrome". Elsewhere in the world, beyond the "girdle of deserts and wilderness", and the "Great Ocean" region of the Indo-Pacific Rim, was the "Monsoon lands" area of India and China that would grow in power.

Mackinder was contemporary of the Swedish political scientist Rudolf Kjellén, born three years later, who like Mackinder was a conservative member of the national parliament from 1910 until 1922 (year of his death). The two fathers of geopolitics both believed that the development of international transportation on land was growing to such a high rate "that the advantage of the sea powers was more of historical importance. Hence, they argued that the pivot of the global political power was the land control of Eurasia while a naval powersuch as the Great Britainwas playing a secondary role. They disagreed about Mackinder's emphasis on serving the British Empire.

Significance
Mackinder's work paved the way for the establishment of geography as a distinct discipline in the United Kingdom. His role in fostering the teaching of geography is probably greater than that of any other single British geographer.

Whilst Oxford did not appoint a statutory Professor of Geography until 1932, both the University of Liverpool and University of Wales, Aberystwyth established professorial chairs in Geography in 1917. Mackinder himself became Professor of Geography at the University of London (London School of Economics) in 1923.

Mackinder is often credited with introducing two new terms into the English language: "manpower" and "heartland". In 1944, he received the Charles P. Daley medal from the American Geographical Society, and in 1945 was awarded the Royal Geographical Society's Patron's Medal for his service in the advancement of the science of Geography.

The Heartland Theory and more generally classical geopolitics and geostrategy were extremely influential in the making of US strategic policy during the period of the Cold War.  Arguably it continued afterwards. The theory has seen a revival in application to China's Belt and Road Initiative.

Evidence of Mackinder's Heartland Theory can be found in the works of geopolitician Dimitri Kitsikis, particularly in his geopolitical model "Intermediate Region". 
In the book Sri Lanka at Crossroads, Asanga Abeyagoonasekera revisits Mackinder's 1904 Map while highlighting the geostrategic importance of Sri Lanka. Reviewing the work, Swaran Singh writes, "Asanga talks of Mackinder's 'outer crescent' that makes him see two other nations, Britain and Japan, being similarly ordained. However, as world drifts from continents to Oceans following Mahanian axioms, it leaves only Sri Lanka that sits in the midst of global east-west super expressway of sea lanes of communications connecting the two ends of the Indo-Pacific geopolitical paradigm."

Works
 Mackinder, H.J. "On the Scope and Methods of Geography", Proceedings of the Royal Geographical Society and Monthly Record of Geography, New Monthly Series, Vol. 9, No. 3 (Mar. 1887), pp. 141–174.
 Mackinder, H.J. Sadler, M.E. University extension: has it a future?, London, Frowde, 1890.
 Mackinder, H.J. "The Physical Basis of Political Geography", Scottish Geographical Magazine Vol 6, No 2, 1890, pp. 78–84.
 Mackinder, H.J. "A Journey to the Summit of Mount Kenya, British East Africa", The Geographical Journal, Vol. 15, No. 5 (May 1900), pp. 453–476.
 Mackinder, H.J. Britain and the British Seas. New York: D. Appleton and company, 1902.
 Mackinder, H.J. "An Expedition to Possil, an Outpost on the Frontiers of the Civilised World", The Times. 12 October 1903.
 Mackinder, H.J. "The geographical pivot of history". The Geographical Journal, 1904, 23, pp. 421–37. Available online as Mackinder, H.J. "The Geographical Pivot of History", in Democratic Ideals and Reality, Washington, DC: National Defence University Press, 1996, pp. 175–194.
 Mackinder, H.J. "Man-Power as a Measure of National and Imperial Strength", National and English Review, XLV, 1905.
 Mackinder, H.J. "Geography and History", The Times. 9 February 1905.
 Mackinder, H.J. as editor of The Regions of the World series which includes the 1902 Britain and the British Seas mentioned above—which included The Nearer East by D.G. Hogarth London, Henry Frowde, 1902 and 1905
 Mackinder, H.J. Our Own Islands: An Elementary Study in Geography, London: G. Philips, 1907
 Mackinder, H.J. The Rhine: Its Valley & History. New York: Dodd, Mead. 1908.
 Mackinder, H.J. Eight Lectures on India. London : Waterlow, 1910.
 Mackinder, H.J. The Modern British State: An Introduction to the Study of Civics. London: G. Philip, 1914.
 Mackinder, H.J. Democratic Ideals and Reality: A Study in the Politics of Reconstruction. New York: Holt, 1919. Available online as Democratic ideals and reality; a study in the politics of reconstruction Democratic Ideals and Reality, Washington, DC: National Defence University Press, 1996.
 Mackinder, H.J. 1943. "The round world and the winning of the peace", Foreign Affairs, 21 (1943) 595–605. Available online as Mackinder, H.J. "The round world and the winning of the peace", in Democratic Ideals and Reality, Washington, DC: National Defence University Press, 1996, pp. 195–205.

References
Notes

Bibliography

 Ashworth, Lucian M. "Realism and the spirit of 1919: Halford Mackinder, geopolitics and the reality of the League of Nations", European Journal of International Relations, 17(2), June 2011, 279–301.
 Blouet, Brian. Global Geostrategy, Mackinder and the Defence of the West, Londres, Frank Cass, 2005.
 Blouet, Brian. Halford Mackinder: A Biography. College Station: Texas A&M University Press, 1987.
 Blouet, Brian, "The imperial vision of Halford Mackinder", Geographical Journal, Volume 170 Issue 4, Pages 322–329.
 Blouet, Brian W., "Sir Halford Mackinder as British high commissioner to South Russia 1919–1920". Geographical Journal, 142 (1976), 228–36.
 Cantor, L.M. "The Royal Geographical Society and the Projected London Institute of Geography 1892–1899". The Geographical Journal, Vol. 128, No. 1 (Mar. 1962), pp. 30–35
 Fettweis, Christopher J. "Sir Halford Mackinder, Geopolitics, and Policymaking in the 21st Century", Parameters, Summer 2000
Kaplan, Robert D. (2012) The Revenge of Geography: What the Maps Tell Us About the Coming Conflicts and the Battle Against Fate New York: Random House. 
 Kearns, Gerry. "Halford John Mackinder, 1861–1947". Geographers: Biobibliographical Studies, 1985, 9, 71–86.
 Kearns, Gerry. Geopolitics and Empire: The Legacy of Halford Mackinder. Oxford: Oxford University Press, 2009.
 Parker, Geoffrey. Western Geopolitical Thought in the Twentieth Century, New York: St. Martin's Press, 1985.
 Parker, W.H. Mackinder: Geography as an Aid to Statecraft, Oxford, Clarendon Press, 1982.
 Sloan, G.R. Geopolitics in United States Strategic Policy, Brighton: Wheatsheaf Books, 1988.
 Sloan, G.R. "Sir Halford Mackinder: the heartland theory then and now", in Gray C S and Sloan G.R., Geopolitics, Geography and Strategy. London: Frank Cass, pp. 15–38.
 Unstead, J.F. H. J. Mackinder and the New Geography, The Geographical Journal, Vol. 113, (Jan. – Jun. 1949), pp. 47–57
 Venier, Pascal. "The Geographical Pivot of History and Early 20th century Geopolitical Culture", Geographical Journal, vol. 170, no 4, December 2004, pp. 330–336.

External links

Mackinder biographical entry at the London School of Economics
The Heartland theory:The blueprint for world domination that spooked America
 

1861 births
1947 deaths
People from Gainsborough, Lincolnshire
Alumni of Christ Church, Oxford
Presidents of the Oxford Union
English geographers
English people of Scottish descent
Geopoliticians
Members of the Privy Council of the United Kingdom
Members of the Parliament of the United Kingdom for Glasgow constituencies
Military geographers
People educated at Epsom College
Academics of the University of Oxford
Academics of the London School of Economics
People associated with the University of Reading
UK MPs 1910
UK MPs 1910–1918
UK MPs 1918–1922
Knights Bachelor
People educated at Queen Elizabeth's High School
Liberal Unionist Party MPs for Scottish constituencies
Unionist Party (Scotland) MPs
Human geographers